Alcibíades Hidalgo Basulto (born 1946?) was one of Raúl Castro's Chief of Staffs for twelve years and also served as Deputy Foreign Minister.  Later he served as Cuba's ambassador to the United Nations (1992–1994) replacing Ricardo Alarcón. He was recalled to Havana and sacked from his post. In 2002, Hidalgo boarded a home-made raft and defected to Miami. He has claimed that "virtually every member of Castro's UN mission is an intelligence agent" and  "Cuba is, pure and simple, a dictatorship each day more devoid of the attributes that once made it attractive."

An anti-American — for most of his adult life — Cuban intellectual, Mr. Hidalgo graduated from the University of Havana with a degree in journalism.  He was editor-in-chief of the Cuban newspaper Trabajadores.  He is divorced and has a daughter, Carolina (b. 1991).

References

 http://findarticles.com/p/articles/mi_m1282/is_17_54/ai_90888279/pg_4
 The Washington Post; Cuba Names New Foreign Minister; June 21, 1992

1946 births
Living people
Cuban emigrants to the United States
Cuban defectors
Communist Party of Cuba politicians
Permanent Representatives of Cuba to the United Nations
University of Havana alumni